The 1983 Borah Peak earthquake occurred on October 28, at  in the western United States, in the Lost River Range at Borah Peak in central Idaho.

The shock measured 6.9 on the moment magnitude scale and had a maximum Mercalli intensity of IX (Violent). It was the most violent earthquake in the lower 48 states in over 24 years, since the 1959 Hebgen Lake earthquake in nearby southwestern

Earthquake
The Friday morning earthquake was caused by a slip on the preexisting Lost River Fault.

The event is the largest and most significant to strike in the state of Idaho. Twelve-and-a-half million dollars in damage took place in the Challis-Mackay region in Custer County. As a result of extreme surface faulting, a maximum Mercalli intensity of IX (Violent) was decided upon, while vibrational damage was at a Mercalli intensity of VI (Strong) to VII (Very strong).

Three weeks later on November 18, President Ronald Reagan declared the earthquake a 

Aftershocks were felt for a year afterwards; nearly ten months later, a 5.4 aftershock was recorded on

Surface faulting
Extensive breakage occurred along a  zone between West Spring and Cedar Creek; ground surface was literally "shattered" into tilted blocks, each several meters in width.

Damage
The Challis-Mackay region experienced rather thorough damage, with eleven commercial buildings and 39 homes sustaining major damage while another 200 houses suffered minor to moderate damage. Most of the city's large buildings on its Main Street were damaged, to some extent; eight of these buildings were deemed condemned and closed down. Most of these buildings were built from materials such as brick, concrete block, and stone, each varying.

An estimated $12.5 million in property damage was recorded. In some places, the water grounds shifted.

Fatalities and injuries

In Challis, two children were killed when a stone storefront collapsed on them while walking to school; two others suffered minor injuries. In Mackay, a woman was hospitalized due to her injuries.

Old Faithful

Sand blows

Near Chilly Buttes of Thousand Springs Valley, a series of artesian fountains/sand blows erupted immediately after the main shock. Groundwater gushed from these fountains forming small craters and depositing aprons of light-colored sandy sediment around each crater. The blows were noted largely along waterways, especially where draws, or small streams, enter into larger ones. Observers noted that some blows have black, sediment laden water while others ran mostly clear. Some blows continued for several minutes after the shaking stopped. The Big Lost River rose several inches as a result of this water being expelled from the ground. The eruptions were likely a response to liquefaction of a water laden underground sediment layer.

See also
List of earthquakes in 1983
List of earthquakes in the United States
Geology of Idaho
2020 Central Idaho earthquake

References

Further reading

Suzette M. Jackson, John Boatwright; Strong ground motion in the 1983 Borah Peak, Idaho, earthquake and its aftershocks. Bulletin of the Seismological Society of America ; 77 (3): 724–738.

External links
 Borah Peak earthquake – Idaho Geological Survey
 M 6.9 - southern Idaho – United States Geological Survey
 Two children die as quake hits northwest and Canada – The New York Times
 

Borah Peak Earthquake, 1983
Earthquakes in Idaho
1983 in Idaho